Meu Passado Me Condena 2 is a 2015 Brazilian comedy film, directed by Júlia Rezende and written by Tati Bernardi, Leandro Muniz and Patricia Corso. It is a sequel of the 2013 film Meu Passado Me Condena, starring Fábio Porchat, Miá Mello, Inez Viana, Marcelo Valle, Ricardo Pereira and Mafalda Pinto.

Plot
The life of newlyweds of Fabio (Fábio Porchat) and Miá (Miá Mello) falls into the rut when differences, which are not few, need to be faced. After Fábio forget the third wedding anniversary, Miá decides to ask for a time in the relationship. When Fábio's grandfather, who lives in Portugal, tells him that he was a widower, he sees on this trip to the funeral an opportunity to save his marriage.

Cast 
 Fábio Porchat as Fábio
 Miá Mello as Miá
 Inez Vianna as Suzana
 Marcelo Valle as Wilson
 Ricardo Pereira as Álvaro
 Mafalda Pinto as Ritinha
 Antonio Pedro as Nuno
 Rafael Queiroga as Cabeça

Production 
The film began to be recorded in November 2014; the first scenes were shot in Portugal. The cast left Rio de Janeiro for Europe, where the first filming took place, and ended in December 2014 in Rio de Janeiro.

References

External links
 

2010s Portuguese-language films
Brazilian comedy films
2015 comedy films
2015 directorial debut films
2015 films
Films shot in Rio de Janeiro (city)
Films set in Rio de Janeiro (city)
Films shot in Lisbon
Films shot in Portugal
Films set in Portugal
Brazilian sequel films